Sefid Khani-ye Olya (also Romanized as Sefīd Khānī-ye ‘Olyā; also known as Sefīd Khānī) is a village in Zangvan Rural District, Karezan District, Sirvan County Ilam Province, Iran. At the 2006 census, its population was 27, in 9 families. The village is populated by Kurds.

References 

Populated places in Sirvan County
Kurdish settlements in Ilam Province